Se mi vuoi bene is a 2019 Italian romantic comedy film directed by Fausto Brizzi.

Cast
Claudio Bisio as Diego Anastasi
Sergio Rubini as Massimiliano
Flavio Insinna as Edoardo
Maria Amelia Monti as Giulia
Lucia Ocone as Loredana
Gianmarco Tognazzi as Alessandro
Lorena Cacciatore as Laura
Memo Remigi as Diego's father
Valeria Fabrizi as Diego's mother
Elena Santarelli as Daniela
Susy Laude as Simona
Dino Abbrescia as Luca
Cochi Ponzoni as Bertoni
Luca Carboni as himself

References

External links

2019 films
Films directed by Fausto Brizzi
Films scored by Bruno Zambrini
2010s Italian-language films
2019 comedy films
Italian romantic comedy films
2010s Italian films